Thomas Anthony Wood (born 11 May 1994) is an English cricketer who plays for Derbyshire County Cricket Club. His career started with a cover drive for four runs off his very first ball against a Sri Lanka A touring team in a List A game, where he went onto score 44 off 41 balls. After scoring heavily in Derbyshire's second XI, Wood went onto make his first-class debut for Derbyshire at the end of 2016 where he played the last two games of the season against Leicestershire and Worcestershire. Primarily an aggressive right-handed batsman, he also bowls right-arm off spin. He made his Twenty20 debut for Derbyshire in the 2017 NatWest t20 Blast on 3 August 2017. 

Wood was released by Derbyshire after the 2017 season but continued to make appearances for the second XI and in local cricket. After a number of impressive appearances in 2019 he rejoined the county on a short-term contract intended to cover the 2020 Royal London One-Day Cup, which was ultimately cancelled due to the COVID-19 pandemic. Wood's contract would instead cover all formats for the truncated 2020 season.

References

External links
 

1994 births
Living people
English cricketers
Derbyshire cricketers
Cricketers from Derbyshire